Captain George Ord Sr. (May 26, 1741 – October 13, 1806) was an sea captain during the American Revolution, and a privateer who worked on behalf of Philadelphia merchants, who later started a rope-making and ship-chandler business in Philadelphia. He was appointed Warden of the Port of Philadelphia in 1785.

Early life 
George Ord was born in England and immigrated to Southwark, Philadelphia County. On January 17, 1767, he married Rebecca Lindmeyer of Southwark, who was the sister-in-law of Reverend Eric Nordenlind, pastor of the Swedish Lutheran Church (commonly called Gloria Dei, or Old Swedes' Church) on the Delaware River. George and Rebecca resided at 784 Front St., in Philadelphia. They had four children including George Ord Jr., who was a famous naturalist, Ann (Ord) Pinkerton, Maria (Ord) McMullen, and Henrietta Ord. The family is buried at the Gloria Dei cemetery.

Revolutionary Activity 

As captain of the Lady Catherine, Ord led a successful gun powder raid at Bermuda in August, 1775, and brought the munitions back to Philadelphia for use by the continental army.

Death and Burial 

Ord died on October 13, 1806, and is buried in a family plot at Gloria Dei Church cemetery.

References 

1741 births
1806 deaths
American sailors
18th-century American naval officers
Continental Navy officers
United States Navy personnel of the American Revolution
Burials at Gloria Dei (Old Swedes') Church